The Hartford Dark Blues moved to Brooklyn, New York prior to the 1877 season and were renamed as the Brooklyn Hartfords. This was to be the Hartfords last season, as they disbanded following the completion of their schedule.

Regular season

Season standings

Record vs. opponents

Roster

Player stats

Batting

Starters by position
Note: Pos = Position; G = Games played; AB = At bats; H = Hits; Avg. = Batting average; HR = Home runs; RBI = Runs batted in

Other batters
Note: G = Games played; AB = At bats; H = Hits; Avg. = Batting average; HR = Home runs; RBI = Runs batted in

Pitching

Starting pitchers
Note: G = Games pitched; IP = Innings pitched; W = Wins; L = Losses; ERA = Earned run average; SO = Strikeouts

Other pitchers
Note: G = Games pitched; IP = Innings pitched; W = Wins; L = Losses; ERA = Earned run average; SO = Strikeouts

References
1877 Brooklyn Hartfords season at Baseball Reference

Hartford Dark Blues seasons
Brooklyn Hartfords season
Brooklyn Hartfords